Ameena Ahmad Ahuja is an Indian painter, calligrapher, writer and linguist, known for her Urdu poetry-inspired art works.

Biography
Ameena Ahmad Ahuja was born to a British mother and Nuruddin Ahmed, a barrister and litterateur. She did her training in art at the Slade School of Art in London. She is a former member of faculty of the Department of Russian at the Jawaharlal Nehru University (JNU) and, besides Russian, she is proficient in languages such as Persian, German, French, Hindi and English. Her career also covered stints at Columbia University as a lecturer of poetry and as an Artist-in-residence at the Harvard University and her exhibitions have been staged at many places in India and abroad including Moscow, Tokyo, Venezuela, Columbia and New York. She has served as the official translator during the visits of Soviet dignitaries including Alexei Kosygin, Nikolai Bulganin, Nikita Khrushchev and Leonid Brezhnev to India. 

She was married to Vishnu Ahuja, a diplomat and former ambassador to the USSR and had opportunities to visit many countries, accompanying her husband, who has since died.

Publications
She is the author of the book, Calligraphy in Islam, a text in Urdu, published 2009 by Penguin India.

Awards and honours
The Government of India awarded her the fourth highest civilian honour of the Padma Shri, in 2009, for her contributions to Arts.

References

Further reading 

 

Year of birth missing (living people)
Living people
20th-century Indian linguists
20th-century Indian Muslims
20th-century Indian painters
20th-century Indian women artists
Alumni of the Slade School of Fine Art
Columbia University faculty
Harvard University faculty
Indian art writers
Indian calligraphers
Indian women linguists
Indian women painters
Academic staff of Jawaharlal Nehru University
Place of birth missing (living people)
Recipients of the Padma Shri in arts
Women calligraphers
21st-century Indian women writers
21st-century Indian writers
21st-century Indian linguists
21st-century Indian women artists
20th-century women writers